John Athy was Sovereign of Galway.

Athy was a member of one of the fourteen families that would later become known as the Tribes of Galway. Several members of the family were killed in a feud with the Blake family, c. 1440.

See also
 Margaret Athy

References
History of Galway, James Hardiman, 1820
Old Galway, Maureen Donovan O'Sullivan, 1942
Henry, William (2002). Role of Honour: The Mayors of Galway City 1485-2001. Galway: Galway City Council.  
Martyn, Adrian (2016). The Tribes of Galway:1124-1642

15th-century Irish monarchs
People from County Galway